overnight service of line S8 (ZVV)
 one of high-altitude prototypes of SpaceX Starship. It was destroyed during a test fight